Brendan Rodgers (born 1973) is a Northern Irish professional football manager and former player.

Brendan Rodgers may also refer to:
Brendan Rodgers (baseball) (born 1996), American baseball player
Brendan Rogers (born 1968), Canadian football player

See also
Brandon Rogers (disambiguation)